BR-154 is a federal highway of Brazil. The 470.3 kilometre road connects Itumbiara to Lins, São Paulo.

References 

Federal highways in Brazil